Refined coal is the product of the coal-upgrading technology that removes moisture and certain pollutants from lower-rank coals such as sub-bituminous and lignite (brown) coals, raising their calorific values. Coal refining or upgrading technologies are typically pre-combustion treatments and processes that alter the characteristics of coal before it is burned. Pre-combustion coal-upgrading technologies aim to increase efficiency and reduce emissions when coal is burned. Depending on the situation, pre-combustion technology can be used in place of or as a supplement to post-combustion technologies to control emissions from coal-fueled boilers. A primary benefit of refined coal is the capacity to reduce the net volume of carbon emissions that is currently emitted from power generators and would reduce the number of emissions that is proposed to be managed via emerging carbon sequestration methodologies. Refined coal technologies have primarily been developed in the United States. Several similar technologies have been researched, developed, and tested in Victoria, Australia, including the Densified coal technology (Coldry Process) developed to alter the chemical bonds of brown coal to create a product that is cleaner, stable (not prone to spontaneous combustion), exportable and of sufficiently high calorific value to be a black coal equivalent.

Coal-upgrading technology 
Coal-upgrading technology refers to a class of technologies developed to remove moisture, and certain pollutants from  low rank coals such as sub-Bituminous coal and lignite (brown coal) and raise their calorific values. Companies in Australia, Germany, and the United States are the principal drivers of these technologies' research, development, and commercialization.

Environmental rationale 
Around 30 nations collectively operate more than 1,400 brown coal-fired power stations worldwide. Brown coal power stations that cannot economically dewater brown coal are inefficient and cause high levels of carbon emissions. High-emitting power stations, notably the Hazelwood power station in Australia, attract environmental criticism. Many modern economies, including Greece and Victoria (Australia), are highly dependent on brown coal for electricity. Improved environmental performance and the need for stable economic environment provide incentives for investment to substantially reduce the negative environmental impact of burning raw ('as mined') brown coal.

Economic rationale 
Coal-upgrading technologies remove moisture from 'as mined' brown coal and transform the calorific performance of brown coal to a 'cleaner' burning status relatively equivalent to high calorific value black coal. Some coal-upgrading processes result in a densified coal product that is considered to be a Black coal equivalent product suitable for burning in black coal boilers.

Victorian brown coal, with a characteristic moisture content of 60% by weight, is regarded as the world's 'wettest' brown coal. The high moisture content is the key reason the state's three major power stations are collectively regarded as the dirtiest carbon emitters in the world. Studies undertaken by the University of Melbourne and Monash University confirm that when moisture is removed from Victorian brown coal, naturally low levels of ash, sulfur, and other elements rank it as being one of the cleanest coals in the world. When dewatered, upgraded brown coal can compete in the export market at comparable prices to black coal.

With significant brown coal mining occurring worldwide and mining levels increasing, the need for coal-upgrading technologies has become more apparent. the technologies will help to address the global environmental concern of rising emissions from the burning of brown coal and provide alternative fuel options to rapidly emerging economies such as Vietnam that face difficulty competing for black coal with China, India, Japan, and other nations.

Technology comparison 

Because of inherent high moisture content, all lignites need to be dried prior to combustion. Depending on the technology type drying is achieved either via a discrete operation or part of a process. The comparison chart identifies different technology drying methods that are in development in different countries and provides a qualitative comparison.

History and advantages

United States 
The best known producer of refined coal is a company based in Denver, Colorado called Evergreen Energy Inc.. The company is publicly traded and is listed on the NYSE Arca exchange. According to the company's website and its Form 10-K on file with the U.S. Securities and Exchange Commission, it was founded in 1984 to commercialize a coal-upgrading technology first developed in a Stanford University laboratory by Edward Koppelman. Taking the K from Koppelman's name, Evergreen, formerly KFx Inc., branded its refined coal product as "K-Fuel."

Much of the coal in the western United States is known as "lower-rank" coal that falls under the categories of "sub-bituminous" and "lignite" coals. These coals have high moisture levels and can be 20 to 30 percent water. This relatively high moisture content compared to "higher rank" coals like bituminous and anthracite coals make lower-rank coals less efficient. The average heat content of sub-bituminous coal consumed in the United States is approximately 8,500 British thermal units (Btu) per pound. The K-Fuel(R) process uses heat and pressure to remove approximately 30 percent of the moisture from raw, low-rank coal and raises its thermal content to approximately 11,000 Btu per pound. In addition to raising the coal's heat value, a significant amount, up to 70 percent, of the elemental mercury in the coal is removed and, because of its higher efficiency, lower chloride and nitrogen oxides emissions are achieved on a per kilowatt hour generated basis.

The advantages of the refined coal process are more efficient transportation and the ability of utilities to switch to a fuel made of 100 percent refined coal or a blend of raw and refined coals in order to achieve lower emissions and greater efficiency. A disadvantage is that the industry requires significant subsidies.  An examination of government figures show that in 2007, for every megawatt-hour generated, refined coal received $29.81 in federal support, solar power received $24.34, wind power received $23.37, and nuclear power received $1.59.

Australia 
The producer of densified coal in Australia is a company based in Melbourne, Victoria called Environmental Clean Technologies Limited (ECT Limited) The company is publicly traded and listed on the Australian Stock Exchange (ASX). The company was listed in 2005 with the primary purpose of commercialising the Coldry Process coal-upgrading methodology first developed in the Chemical Laboratory of Melbourne University by Dr B. A. John in the 1980s. The name of the process derived from the Calleja Group, which acquired the technology in 1994 and developed the technology to pilot demonstration at Maddingley Mine, Bacchus Marsh, Victoria in 2004 before licensing the technology to ECT Limited for further commercialisation in 2005.

The State of Victoria contains approximately 25% of the world's known reserves of brown coal (lignite). This coal is also amongst the world's 'wettest' coal, with a typical moisture content of 60 per cent water by weight. High moisture content makes Victorian brown coal an inefficient fuel source and is the primary reason why the Hazelwood power station in the Latrobe Valley is regarded as the world's dirtiest coal-fired power station. The Coldry Process uses low-pressure mechanical shear to create a natural exothermic reaction within the coal that then naturally expels 80 per cent of the moisture content. Expelled moisture is then captured and recovered as distilled water. Victorian brown coal transformed by the Coldry Process has a raised thermal content of 5874 kcal/kg, which is comparable to most export-grade Australian black coal.

The advantage of the Coldry Process is its ability to allow power generators to switch to a blend of raw as mined brown coal and Coldry pellets to achieve lower emissions in existing inefficient boilers, or achieve substantially less emissions by introducing black coal boilers and using 100 per cent Coldry refined coal pellets as a black coal equivalent. The Coldry Process provides the added advantage of creating new revenue streams for power generators through the production of a product that can be exported to other countries as a replacement for black coal. Unlike other refined coal processes, the Coldry Process is a commercial methodology that does not require subsidy.

Commercial development

United States 
Evergreen Energy constructed a full-scale coal refinery near Gillette, Wyoming that began operation in late 2005. Designed originally to be a commercial plant, the facility encountered design and operational problems. Evergreen idled the facility in March 2008 and instead used the plant as a process development platform with its engineering, construction and procurement contractor Bechtel Power Corporation.

Evergreen is now seeking to construct a coal refinery using the improved Bechtel design at locations in the Midwestern United States and in Asia.

Australia 
Calleja Group constructed a full-scale 16,000 tonne per annum pilot demonstration plant at JBD Business Park at Maddingley Mine near Bacchus Marsh, Victoria that began operation in early 2004. From 2005 ECT Limited upgraded the facility, added a water recovery process with Victorian Government funding in 2007 and operated the plant as a process development platform with its engineering partner ARUP.  In 2009 ECT Limited secured and agreement with Thang Long Investment Company (Tincom) of Vietnam to finalise commercial feasibility ahead of construction of a 2 million tonne pa export plant by 2014 and 20 million tonne pa export by 2020.
ECT Limited is using the ARUP improved design to secure technology licensing agreements with brown coal suppliers in China, India, Indonesia, Poland, Greece and Russia.

China 
GBCE has built and is now operating the world's first industrial-scale coal-upgrading facility. It has capacity to process 1 MTPA of coal feedstock and is located in Holingol, Inner Mongolia, the largest lignite-producing region in China. The coal is typically high moisture (35 – 40% TM) and 3200 – 3400 kcal gar.  Depending on market requirements, it produces 5000–5500 kcal coal (gar) with greatly reduced moisture content (< 10% gar). The plant uses LCP coal-upgrading technology, which is a pyrolytic process that employs heat and pressure in an oxygen-free environment to continue the coalification process that occurs naturally in the earth. The processed coal by this technology is hydrophobic and transportable, which means it will not reabsorb moisture or break up into powder during transportation.

See also 

 Bituminous coal
 Bergius process
 Coal assay
 Coldry Process
 Coke fuel
 Densified coal
 Energy value of coal
 Fischer–Tropsch process
 Karrick process
 Leonardite
 Lignite
 Maddingley Mine
 Orders of magnitude (specific energy density)
 List of CO2 emitted per million Joule of energy from various fuels

References 

Coal